Lake Galena may refer to:
Lake Galena (Illinois), a reservoir in Jo Daviess County, Illinois
Lake Galena (Pennsylvania), a reservoir in Bucks County, Pennsylvania